The Molidae comprise the family of the molas or ocean sunfishes, unusual fish whose bodies come to an end just behind the dorsal and anal fins, giving them a "half-fish" appearance.

Description

Molidae have the fewest vertebrae of any fish, with only 16 in Mola mola. They also completely lack all caudal bones, and most of their skeleton is made of cartilage. No bony plates occur in the skin, which is, however, thick and dense like cartilage and is fairly rough. They also lack swim bladders.

Molids mostly swim by using their anal and dorsal fins; the pectoral fins are probably just stabilizers. To steer, they squirt a strong jet of water out of their mouths or gills. They can also make minor adjustments in the orientation of the anal fin or the dorsal fin so as to control the amount of force it produces and the angle at which the force is produced. In this respect, they use their fins much like a bird uses its wings.

Molids are said to be able to produce sound by grinding their pharyngeal teeth, which are long and claw-like. Typical of a member of Tetraodontiformes, their teeth are fused into a beak-like structure, making it impossible for them to close their mouths. Despite this, they feed mainly on soft-bodied animals, such as jellyfish and salps, although they  also take small fish or crustaceans.

Behavior
Molids have been filmed interacting with other species. Since molids are susceptible to skin parasites, they make use of cleaner fish. A molid in need of cleaning will locate a patch of floating algae or flotsam that is home to halfmoons. The molid signals a readiness for cleaning by swimming almost vertically with its head near the surface of the water, and waits for the smaller cleaner fish to feed on the parasite worms. Similarly, the molid may break the surface of the water with its dorsal fin and beak to attract the attention of a gull or similar seabird. The seabird will then dig worms and other stubborn parasites out of the molid's skin.

Fossil record 
The known fossil history of Molidae extends back to the Eocene with the genus Eomola containing the species E. bimaxillaria Tyler and Bannikov, 1992 known from the Upper Eocene of the North Caucasus. The fossil genus Austromola containing one species, A. angerhoferi Gregorova, Schultz, Harzhauser & Kroh, 2009, is known from the Lower Miocene Ebelsberg Formation near Pucking, Austria. At least one fossil species of Mola, M. pileata (van Beneden, 1881), is known from the Upper and Middle Miocene of Europe with a possible second species known from the Lower Miocene of North Carolina, United States. The genus Ranzania has five known fossil species: R. grahami Weems, 1985 and R. tenneyorum Weems, 1985, both from the Middle Miocene Calvert Formation of Virginia, USA; R. zappai Carnevale, 2007 from the Middle Miocene of Italy; R. ogaii Uyeno & Sakamoto, 1994 from the Middle Miocene of Japan; and an as yet unnamed species from the Upper Miocene of Algeria.

Species 
Only five extant species in three extant genera are described:
 Ocean sunfish (Mola mola)
 Southern ocean sunfish (Mola alexandrini), has been recognized as a senior synonym of Mola ramsayi (Gaglioli 1889), the "bump-head sunfish"
 Hoodwinker sunfish (Mola tecta)
 Slender sunfish (Ranzania laevis)
 Sharptail mola (Masturus lanceolatus)

References

 
Ray-finned fish families
Extant Eocene first appearances
Eocene vertebrates of Europe
Neogene vertebrates of Europe
Paleogene vertebrates of Europe
Taxa named by Charles Lucien Bonaparte